The Swindle is a 1997 French crime-comedy film directed by Claude Chabrol that stars Isabelle Huppert and Michel Serrault.

Plot
Victor and Betty are small-time confidence tricksters operating from a camper van who specialise in business conventions. Betty lures a delegate to a hotel room, where she slips him knock-out drops. Victor then joins her and they go through his cash, cheques, credit cards and passport. Victor's golden rule is never to be greedy, instead taking just a bit from each victim.

Betty enjoys exercising her powers of attraction, however, and gets more ambitious. She starts an affair with Maurice, who is a courier for money launderers and has to deliver an attaché case to the Caribbean. Victor reluctantly joins her plot, and they switch Maurice's case, which contains 5 million Swiss francs, for an identical case they have filled with newspaper. When Maurice's contacts find they have been swindled, they first torture him to death and then go looking for Victor and Betty. After the two have undergone some brutal questioning, they hand over the right case with 2.8 million Swiss francs in it.  Fooled by Victor's golden rule, the gangsters let the pair go.

Victor, cross with Betty for stepping out of their league and endangering their lives, disappears with the 2.2 million Swiss francs he kept. She tracks him down at his Swiss hideaway and in the end the two make up.

Cast
 Isabelle Huppert as Elizabeth / Betty
 Michel Serrault as Victor
 François Cluzet as Maurice Biagini
 Jean-François Balmer as Monsieur K
 Jackie Berroyer as Robert Chatillon
 Jean Benguigui as Guadeloupe Gangster
 Mony Dalmès as Signora Trotti (as Mony Dalmes)
 Thomas Chabrol as Swiss Desk Clerk
 Yves Verhoeven as Pickpocket
 Henri Attal as Greek Vendor

See also
 Isabelle Huppert on screen and stage

References

External links

1997 films
1997 comedy films
1990s crime comedy films
French crime comedy films
1990s French-language films
Films directed by Claude Chabrol
Films featuring a Best Actor Lumières Award-winning performance
Films about con artists
Films produced by Marin Karmitz
1990s French films